4007 may refer to:

Astronomy
 4007 Euryalos, a larger Jupiter trojan from the Greek camp

Transportation
 General Motors TD-4007, a 1944–1945 American transit bus
 General Motors TG-4007, a 1944–1945 American transit bus
 Peugeot 4007, a 2007–2012 Japanese-French compact SUV
 STANAG 4007, a standard agreement in military organizations for trailer connections